or  is a week from 29 April to early May containing multiple Japanese holidays.

Holidays celebrated 
Golden Week encompasses the following public holidays.

Note that   is a generic term for any official holiday. 4 May was until 2006 an unnamed but official holiday because of a rule that converts any day between two holidays into a new holiday. Japan celebrates Labor Thanksgiving Day, a holiday with a similar purpose to May Day (as celebrated in Europe and North America). When a public holiday lands on a Sunday, the next day that is not already a holiday becomes a holiday for that year.

History
The National Holiday Laws, promulgated in July 1948, declared nine official holidays. Since many were concentrated in a week spanning the end of April to early May, many leisure-based industries experienced spikes in their revenues. The film industry was no exception. In 1951, the film Jiyū Gakkō recorded higher ticket sales during this holiday-filled week than any other time in the year (including New Year's and Obon). This prompted the managing director of Daiei Film Co., Ltd. to dub the week "Golden Week" based on the Japanese radio lingo "golden time", which denotes the period with the highest listener ratings. At the time, 29 April was a national holiday celebrating the birth of the Shōwa Emperor. In 2007, Greenery Day was moved to 4 May, and 29 April was renamed Shōwa Day to commemorate the late Emperor.   was celebrated from 1927 to 1948 and it is now called . Emperor Naruhito's birthday is on 23 February.

Current practice
Many Japanese nationals take paid time off during this holiday, and some companies are closed down completely and give their employees time off. Golden Week is the longest vacation period of the year for many Japanese workers.

Travel
Golden Week is a popular time for holiday travel. Many Japanese travel domestically and to a lesser extent internationally.

Festivals
The Takatsuki Jazz Street Festival is held during Golden Week. It has two days of live jazz performances with 300 acts and over 3,000 artists in 72 different locations in-and-around the center of Takatsuki in northern Osaka.

Sports
The Super GT Fuji 500 km car race is held on the 4th of May and became synonymous with that date in Golden Week.

Transition to Reiwa
Golden Week in 2019 was particularly long due to the 2019 Japanese imperial transition, with the succession of the new emperor on 1 May designated as an additional national holiday.  The day marks the official beginning of the new Reiwa era.  As 29 April and 3 May are already holidays, this caused 30 April and 2 May to be public holidays as well, making 2019's Golden Week ten consecutive days, from Saturday 27 April through Monday 6 May.

Impact of COVID-19 pandemic

Due to the COVID-19 pandemic, in 2020, Tokyo Governor Yuriko Koike discouraged holiday travel during "Golden Week" to prevent the spread of infection. The rebranded "Stay Home Week to Save Lives" ran from April 25 through to May 6. Osaka governor Hirofumi Yoshimura closed schools on May 7 and 8 and businesses in the Kansai region were encouraged to extend the holiday period through the weekend until May 11.

See also
Holidays of Japan
Golden Week in China
Silver Week

Footnotes

References

Festivals in Japan
Public holidays in Japan
May observances
April observances
Wasei-eigo